Everybody is a 1996 single by MC Kinky, recorded under the alias "Kinky". It made #71 on the UK Singles Chart.

References

1996 singles
1996 songs
MC Kinky songs